Cransford Meadow is a  biological Site of Special Scientific Interest south of Cransford in Suffolk.

This unimproved grassland site has a rich variety of flora. There are grasses such as creeping bent, meadow foxtail, sweet vernal-grass, crested dog's tail, perennial rye-grass and rough-stalked meadow-grass. It is one of only two sites in the county for ladies mantle Alchemilla filicaulis vestita.

The site is private land with no public access.

References

Sites of Special Scientific Interest in Suffolk